Kromołów (German: Krumlau)- a former town (from 1870 to 1977), it is the oldest, and most historic borough of Zawiercie, located on the Kraków-Częstochowa Upland.

History

The hamlet of Kromołów was founded before 1193, by the knight Kromol, from which the settlement's name comes from. The first owners of this land were the Kromołowscy.

Kromołów gained town rights in the 14th or 15th centuries, and lost them in the 19th century, as part of Russian repressions on the land due to the January Uprising. In between the years of 1973 and 1977, the settlement was the headquarters of the Kromołów Gmina. On 1 February 1977, the village was incorporated into the town of Zawiercie, as one of its boroughs.

References

Zawiercie County
Cities and towns in Silesian Voivodeship